Louise Campbell Weisbecker (May 30, 1911 – November 5, 1997) was an American actress.  Despite her success in Hollywood, she made it clear she preferred the stage.

Campbell was a leading lady in the late 1930s films, notably Bulldog Drummond Comes Back (1937) and The Star Maker (1939).

Early years
Campbell was born Louise Weisbecker in Chicago, Illinois. She had a sister named Ottilia.

Campbell attended St. Michael's School. Northwestern University] and DePaul University, studying dramatic arts at the latter. She gained additional dramatic training at the Chicago School of Expression. She said that when she was 6 years old, she decided to be an actress after she watched a production of Uncle Tom's Cabin.

At one point, she worked as a dental assistant, an experience which she said was "invaluable to me in my acting" as she observed changes in patients' facial expressions in the dentist's office, with their changing expressions displaying "their real character."

Stage
Campbell gained early theatrical experience by performing in stock theater. Her Broadway debut was in Three Men on a Horse (1935). Her other Broadway credits include Julie the Great, Guest in the House (1941), A House in the Country (1936) and White Man (1936). A column in the June 13, 1942, issue of Billboard complimented "Louise Campbell, that fine actress, for a lovely, beautifully projected, altogether excellent performance in Guest in the House."

Film
Campbell went to Hollywood in 1937 and made 13 films in the 1930s and 1940s. Her film debut was in Bulldog Drummond Comes Back (1937). Her film credits included Bulldog Drummond sequels Night Club Scandal (1937), Men with Wings (1938), The Buccaneer (1938) with Fredric March, and The Star Maker (1939).

Personal life
Campbell was married to actor Horace McMahon, whom she met when they were both in the Broadway play Three Men on a Horse. They wed in 1938 and remained married until his death in 1971.

Death
Campbell died November 5, 1997 in Norwalk Hospital in Norwalk, Connecticut. She is buried at St. Mary's Cemetery in Norwalk, Connecticut.

Filmography

References

External links

1911 births
American film actresses
1997 deaths
American stage actresses
Actresses from Chicago
20th-century American actresses